Michael Robert Hill (born 30 June 1974) is a former tennis player from Australia who turned professional in 1997 and retired in 2005. He was primarily a doubles specialist, achieving a career-high doubles ranking of World Number 18, reached on 30 July 2001.

Career

College

Hill played three years at University of California-Berkeley from 1994–96 and earned All-American honors in singles in 1995-96; he studied business and economics.

Professional career

In 1995, Hill played in his first pro match at Aptos Challenger where he lost in the first round. In 1997 he reached his first quarter final, at the Guadalajara Challenger.

In 1998 he achieved some singles success in Futures and Challenger play. He won the Ireland #1 Futures title, where he defeated Noam Okun, and was also a finalist at USTA #1 Futures, where he lost to Ronald Agenor. He also made a Semi Final at USTA #2 Futures. In August, Hill won his first Challenger title in Tijuana (d. Hernandez) without dropping a set. He also reached quarter finals in San Antonio and Las Vegas Challengers. In doubles, won Challenger titles in Denver with Weiner, and Tijuana with Humphries. He also reached three consecutive finals in October in Dallas, San Antonio and San Diego, all with Humphries.

In 1999, Hill captured his second Challenger singles title in Aptos (d. Levy) and reached the quarterfinals of the Surbiton Challenger. Most of his success was in doubles; he won four Challenger titles, with back-to-back titles in Cherbourg and Magdeburg (with Painter) and in the second half of year, won in Aptos (with Humphries) and Hong Kong (with Godwin). In his second career ATP outing in Tokyo, advanced to semi finals with Humphries. In July, he reached the semi finals in Newport (with Godwin) and made quarterfinals in four other ATP tournaments.

In 2000 he captured his first ATP doubles title in Brighton and also reached final in Tokyo with American Jeff Tarango, whom he'd have more success with the following year. He played in eight singles tournaments with his best result coming at Kyoto Challenger in March when he advanced to semi finals, along with a quarter final's appearance at the Hamilton Challenger. He made his Grand Slam singles debut at Australian Open, where he defeated Bernd Karbacher in straight sets in the first round. In the second round, he lost to Sébastien Grosjean 4–6, 6–1, 7-6(3), 6–0.

2001

He played eight other partners during the year, but mostly played with Tarango. The duo finished No. 9 in ATP Doubles Race with a 30–17 match record, winning their second title together in Casablanca in March as well as reaching finals in Marseille, Gstaad and Stuttgart. Their best Grand Slam together was reaching the semi finals at Roland Garros after defeating top seeds Jonas Björkman and Todd Woodbridge in the quarter finals. Finished the year with a career-high $190,217 in yearly earnings and finished the season at a year-end best No. 25 in doubles.

Personal 

His father, Robert was the CFO of Abacus Property a publicly listed property development company. He has two siblings: younger brother Patrick and one older sister Carmel.

ATP Career Finals

Doubles: 9 (3 titles, 6 runner-ups)

ATP Challenger and ITF Futures finals

Singles: 4 (3–1)

Doubles: 15 (11–4)

Performance timelines

Singles

Doubles

Mixed doubles

References

External links
 
 

1974 births
Sportsmen from New South Wales
Tennis players from Sydney
Australian male tennis players
Australian expatriate sportspeople in the United States
California Golden Bears men's tennis players
Living people